Frondihabitans cladoniiphilus is a Gram-positive bacterium from the genus Frondihabitans which has been isolated from the thallus of the lichen Cladonia arbuscula from the Koralpe, Austria.

References

Microbacteriaceae
Bacteria described in 2011